The Parliamentary Under-Secretary of State for Apprenticeships and Skills (also known as Apprenticeships and Skills Minister) is a junior ministerial position in the Department for Education in the British government. It was held by Alex Burghart MP, who took office on 17 September 2021, until his resignation on 6 July 2022.

Responsibilities 
The minister is responsible for the following:

 Strategy for post-16 education (jointly with Minister of State for Universities)
 Technical education and skills including T Levels and qualifications review
 Apprenticeships including traineeships
 Further education workforce
 Further education provider market including quality and improvement and further education efficiency
 Adult education, including the National Retraining Scheme and basic skills
 Institutes of Technology and National Colleges
 Reducing the number of young people who are not in education, employment or training
 Careers education, information and guidance including the Careers and Enterprise Company
 Coronavirus (COVID-19) response for further education services

List of ministers 
 Kevin Brennan (Minister of State for Further Education, Skills, Apprenticeships and Consumer Affairs)
 John Hayes (Minister of State for Further Education, Skills and Lifelong Learning)
 Matt Hancock (Minister of State for Skills and Enterprise)
 Nick Boles (Minister of State for Skills)
 Robert Halfon (Minister of State for Skills)
 Anne Milton (Minister of State for Skills and Apprenticeships)
 Gillian Keegan (Parliamentary Under-Secretary of State for Apprenticeships and Skills)
 Alex Burghart (Parliamentary Under-Secretary of State for Apprenticeships and Skills)

Notes

References 

Education in the United Kingdom
Department for Education
Education ministers of the United Kingdom